Gentleman's Fate is a 1931 American pre-Code drama film directed by Mervyn LeRoy and written by Leonard Praskins. The film stars John Gilbert, Louis Wolheim, Leila Hyams, Anita Page, and Marie Prevost. The film was released on March 7, 1931, by Metro-Goldwyn-Mayer, just seventeen days after Wolheim's untimely death.

Plot
Jack Thomas (John Gilbert) has grown up in the belief that he was an orphan. His guardian tells him that he has an elder brother in New Jersey named Frank Tomasulo (Louis Wolheim), and a dying father, Francesco (Frank Reicher), both of whom are in the bootlegging business during the prohibition era.

On his deathbed, Francesco gives Jack an emerald necklace. Jack gives it to his fiancée, Marjorie Channing (Leila Hyams), but it turns out to have been stolen. Frank does not want his father's name to be dishonored, so he forces Jack to falsely admit to having stolen the necklace. Marjorie breaks off the engagement and travels to England.

After a brief spell in jail and Francesco's death, Jack realizes he can never resume his place in polite society and, with Frank's encouragement, decides to join the family business. During the attempted hijacking of the gang's booze by the Florio mob, he kills Dante (Ralph Ince), Florio's brother-in-law, saving Frank's life.

Several months later, Jack returns to Jersey after having hidden out in Canada. Frank is throwing a "peace banquet" to show Florio (John Miljan) who's the boss, especially by fixing up Jack with Ruth (Anita Page), Florio's old girlfriend. Florio agrees to work with Frank's mob, splitting things 50-50, as long as he can kill the man who shot Dante. Jack enters the party, and Florio instantly recognizes him as the shooter, throwing out insinuations at both him and Ruth.

Jack throws a punch at Florio and the gangs draw their guns, but the violence is cut short as cops raid the joint. Jack tells Frank that, with Marjorie due to return from abroad, he wants to quit the racket and get back together with her, but Frank shows him a newspaper story telling of her marriage. After drinking an entire bottle of whiskey, the drunken Jack marries Ruth.

In revenge, Florio makes plans to kill Jack and Ruth as they're about to leave for their honeymoon. A waiter tips off Frank's men, but Florio anticipates the betrayal and shoots the waiter, revealing his plan to commit the murders immediately. Mabel (Marie Prevost), a moll in Frank's gang, sees Florio and his men approach Ruth's apartment, realizes what's happening, and alerts Frank.

Jack arrives at Ruth's apartment and kills Florio's girlfriend. Florio, hearing the gunshots, draws his gun, but Ruth shoots him in the back. The wounded Florio turns, and Jack finishes the job just as Frank enters. Jack, having been shot himself, falls, mortally wounded.

In Ruth's bedroom, Jack is lying in bed and a doctor tells Frank it's curtains for Jack. Jack tells his brother to get out of the racket, and as he dies, tells Frank to take care of his wife.

Cast 
 John Gilbert as Giacomo Tomasulo / Jack Thomas
 Louis Wolheim as Frank Tomasulo
 Leila Hyams as Marjorie Channing
 Anita Page as Ruth Corrigan
 Marie Prevost as Mabel
 John Miljan as Florio
 George Cooper as Mike
 Ferike Boros as Angela
 Ralph Ince as Dante
 Frank Reicher as Papa Francesco Tomasulo
 Paul Porcasi as Papa Mario Giovanni
 Tenen Holtz as Tony

References

External links
 
 
 
 

1931 films
1930s English-language films
American drama films
1931 drama films
Metro-Goldwyn-Mayer films
Films directed by Mervyn LeRoy
American black-and-white films
1930s American films